Al-Burj was a Palestinian Arab village 14 km east of Ramle close to the highway to Ramallah, which was depopulated in 1948. Its name, "the tower", is believed to be derived from the crusader castle, Castle Arnold, built on the site. Victorian visitors in the 19th century recorded seeing crusader ruins close to the village.

History

A Byzantine lintel was found in the village in the 1870s, with "a Greek cross inscribed in a circle, and having its four arms ornamented with curious facet-work."

Just west of Al-Burj is Kŭlảt et Tantûrah, "the castle of the peak." It is the remains of a tower, with 5 meter thick walls, and a door to the east. It is possible the Crusader castle called Tharenta, under Muslim rule since 1187.

While nearby Bayt Jiz often has been identified as the Crusader village of Gith, some scholars (Schmitt, 1980; Fischer, Isaac and Roll, 1996) have suggested that Gith was actually at Kŭlảt et Tantûrah.

Ottoman era

In 1838 el-Burj was noted as a Muslim  village, in the Ibn Humar area in the  District of Er-Ramleh.  It was also noted as a  being small, "situated on an isolated hill surrounded by open vallies and plains." It was further noted that "there are here evident traces of an ancient site, apparently once fortified." 

In 1863  Victor Guérin found the village to have no more than 200 inhabitants, and noted that the  Crusader fortress was in ruins.

An  Ottoman village list from about 1870 showed that Al-Burj   had  a population of 139  in a total of  31 houses, though that population count included men, only. It was further noted that it was located one hour from Beit Ur al-Tahta.

In 1873-74 Clermont-Ganneau  noted that the village was closely connected with Bir Ma'in.

In 1883, the PEF's Survey of Western Palestine (SWP) described Al-Burj  as  "a small village on a hill-top, with open ground beneath on all sides. There are remains of a  Crusading fortress (Kulat et Tanturah), and the position is a strong one, near the main road to Lydda. It is possible that this is the site of the Castellum Arnoldi, near Beit Nuba, 'in primes auspices campestrum,' built in 1131 A.D. by the Patriarch of Jerusalem, to protect the approach to that city (William of Tyre)."

British Mandate era

In the  1922 census of Palestine conducted by the British Mandate authorities, Al Burj  had a population of 344; all Muslims,  increasing in the 1931 census to 370, still all Muslims, in a total of 92 houses.

In the 1945 statistics, the village had a population of 480 Muslims, with a total land area of 4,708  dunams.  6 dunams were either irrigated or used for orchards, 2,631 were used for cereals, while 12 dunams were built-up (urban) areas.

An elementary school for boys was completed in 1947 with around 35 pupils.

1948, aftermath
Al-Burj was occupied  by the Israeli Army on July 15, 1948, during the second phase of Operation Dani.  The Arab Legion counterattacked the following day with two infantry platoons and ten armoured cars but were forced to retreat. According to the Haganah 30 Arabs were killed and four armoured vehicles captured with 3 Israelis killed. Aref al-Aref records around 13 Legionaires killed.
Two elderly women and men remained. On the 23 July, one, a military cook, was sent out to pick vegetables. In his absence the other three were led to a house which, when an antitank shell missed, was blown up with six grenades. Two died: the surviving woman was then executed, and their bodies torched. The cook, on returning, didn't believe the story that they had been sent to a hospital in Ramallah, and some time later was executed with four bullets. 
In 1992 the village site was described: "Only one crumbled house remains on the hilltop. Cactuses and wild plants grow on the site. The nearby settlements uses the village for hothouse agriculture."

In 2002 a woman, Kawthar al-Amir, published a 64 page long book about Al-Burj. According to Rochelle Davis, the book is "innovatively styled for children, the descendants of the village who do not know about the village," and it is a "question and answer format, as a conversation between her and her granddaughter Bahiyya."

References

Bibliography

External links
Welcome To al-Burj
al-Burj, Zochrot
Survey of Western Palestine, Map 17:    IAA, Wikimedia commons
al-Burj, at Khalil Sakakini Cultural Center

Arab villages depopulated during the 1948 Arab–Israeli War
District of Ramla